Balraj Singh Panesar (born 16 March 1996) is a Canadian field hockey player who plays as a defender or midfielder for the English Premier Club East Grinstead HC and the Canadian national team.

Panesar was born on 16 March 1996 in Surrey, British Columbia. He was introduced to the sport by his father; his elder brother Sukhi Panesar has also represented Canada in field hockey.

Club career
Panesar played for the UBC Thunderbirds and United Brothers in Canada before moving to England. He joined East Grinstead in 2021 having played the season before for Oxted.

International career
Panesar made his national senior team debut in 2014. The same year, he was part of the Canadian team that won the silver medal at the Youth Olympics in Nanjing, China. He captained the Canadian team at the 2016 Men's Hockey Junior World Cup in Lucknow, India. He was part of the national team that clinched silver at the 2017 Men's Pan American Cup in Lancaster, United States. He was selected for the 2018 World Cup, where he played all four games. In June 2019, he was selected in the Canada squad for the 2019 Pan American Games. They won the silver medal as they lost 5–2 to Argentina in the final.

References

External links
 
 
 
 
 
 

1996 births
Living people
Canadian male field hockey players
Sportspeople from Surrey, British Columbia
Canadian sportspeople of Indian descent
Canadian people of Punjabi descent
Male field hockey defenders
Male field hockey midfielders
Field hockey players at the 2014 Summer Youth Olympics
Field hockey players at the 2018 Commonwealth Games
2018 Men's Hockey World Cup players
Field hockey players at the 2019 Pan American Games
Pan American Games silver medalists for Canada
Pan American Games medalists in field hockey
UBC Thunderbirds players
Medalists at the 2019 Pan American Games
Commonwealth Games competitors for Canada
Youth Olympic silver medalists for Canada
East Grinstead Hockey Club players
Men's England Hockey League players
20th-century Canadian people
21st-century Canadian people